Patrick McEnroe and Jonathan Stark were the defending champions, but McEnroe did not compete this year. Stark teamed up with Gary Muller and lost in the first round to tournament runners-up Diego Nargiso and Peter Nyborg.

Stephen Noteboom and Fernon Wibier won the title by defeating Nargiso and Nyborg 6–3, 1–6, 7–6 in the final.

Seeds

Draw

Draw

References

External links
 Official results archive (ATP)
 Official results archive (ITF)

Rosmalen Grass Court Championships
1994 ATP Tour